No. 188 Squadron RAF was a Royal Flying Corps and  Royal Air Force Squadron that was a night training unit towards the end of World War I.

History

Formation in World War I
The squadron formed at Throwley Aerodrome on 20 December 1917 to train night-fighter pilots and was equipped with Avro 504s.  It also trained pilots to fly the Sopwith Camel and Sopwith Pup at night. It disbanded on 1 March 1919 and never reformed in later years, however a squadron code was allocated to it in 1939.

Aircraft operated

 No. 188 Squadron is depicted in the 1969 film The Battle of Britain led by Squadron Leader Canfield, played by Michael Caine.  
No 188 squadron is also depicted in the film 'An Appointment in London' starring Dirk Bogarde & Dinah Sheridan.

References

External links
 History of No.'s 186–190 Squadrons at RAF Web
 188 Squadron history on the official RAF website

188
Military units and formations established in 1917
1917 establishments in the United Kingdom